Nellie the Elephant was a British children's cartoon series created by Terry Ward on behalf of FilmFair, Flicks Films and 101 Film Productions Limited in the United Kingdom that ran from 8 January 1990 to 19 December 1990. The series featured Lulu as the voice of Nellie, with Tony Robinson providing other voices and also narrating the show. A comic-book annual was released in 1990 in an attempt to further advertise the series, but the annual failed to attract a wide audience.

Plot
Based on the famous children's song, "Nellie the Elephant", the series revolves around a pink elephant named Nellie who is returning to her home in Mandalay after escaping from the circus. Throughout the series, she meets new characters and sometimes returns to the same places in her quest to return home, though curiously, all of her travels are within the United Kingdom.

Another recurring character is a Dick Dastardly-like Ringmaster keen to recapture Nellie at all costs and return her to the circus, but is continuously foiled by Nellie and her friends.

Characters
Nellie – A pink elephant and the main character with a fondness for currant buns (which sometimes proves to be her undoing), Nellie escaped from the circus in an effort to return to Mandalay at all costs, travelling by train, taxi, bus, coach, plane and ship. Keen to help, Nellie is proud of her home and will stand up for her rights if need be.
The Head of the Herd – An old dark grey elephant with one cut off tusk who, as his title suggests, is the leader of the herd. Every episode ends with him making his special sound from far, far away, which can usually be heard floating on the breeze and drifting in the wind, calling for Nellie to come back home. Unlike Nellie, he doesn't speak, he just trumpets like real elephants would.
Captain Jack – A sea-captain from the fictitious Oyster Bay, Captain Jack is the captain of a small tug-boat called The Jungle Queen, and is accompanied by his one-eyed parrot, Nelson.
Mr. Mack and Mr. Tosh – A play on Mackintosh and perhaps a reference to the Goofy Gophers, Mr. Mack and Mr. Tosh are two tailors who share a shop in Oyster Bay that Nellie constantly returns to.
The Ringmaster – A Dick Dastardly sort of villain, the Ringmaster is the owner of the Circus Nellie escaped from, but his villainous traits and reasons for recapturing Nellie are never expanded on in any great detail. He tracks Nellie down in a town in "Nellie at the Big Store", the penultimate episode of the series and is dangerously close to catching her but she is able to flee in a balloon with the help of two Balloon Sellers.
Farmer Styles – A farmer who Nellie encounters on her journey in the episode "Nellie Visits a Farm", She helps him find a stray sheep and he and his wife reward her with a large feast. Farmer Styles reappears in "Nellie on A Snowy Day" when Nellie assists him after a snowstorm, "Nellie and the Burning Farm" when his barn catches alight and Nellie helps extinguish the blaze.
Sergeant Boot - The police sergeant of the village near the Styles farm who appears in "Nellie on a Snowy Day" who Nellies tries to help get his car out of a snowbank and is unsuccessful at first but is able to later clear the snow.
Captain Match – The chief of the Fire Brigade in the Neighbouring village to the Styles farm. By the time he arrives to tackle the blaze, Nellie has already extinguished it. He appears again in "Nellie Rescues Mrs Maple's Moggy" when Mrs Maple's cat, Tiger needs rescuing from a high telephone wire and Nellie is on hand to help him.
The Bluebell Patrol – A group of girl scouts who Nellie encounters in the first episode, "Nellie and the Ghost". They are initially afraid of Nellie at first but warm to her and convince their Scoutmistress, Miss Nettle to let Nellie stay with their troop.

Episodes

Series 1 (1990)
 Nellie and the Ghost (8 January 1990)
 Nellie Visits a Farm (15 January 1990)
 Nellie Goes to Sea (22 January 1990)
 Nellie on a Snowy Day (29 January 1990)
 Nellie at the Seaside (5 February 1990)
 Nellie's Raincoat (12 February 1990)
 Nellie and the Whale (19 February 1990)
 Nellie and the Burning Farm (26 February 1990)
 Nellie Takes a Jumbo Jet (5 March 1990)
 Nellie the Theatre Star (12 March 1990)
 Nellie and the Haunted House (19 March 1990)
 Nellie and the Park Disco (26 March 1990)
 Nellie at the Fun Fair (2 April 1990)
 Nellie Rescues Mrs Maple's Moggy (9 April 1990)

Series 2 (1990)
 Nellie Goes Ballooning (5 September 1990)
 Nellie Goes to the Moon (12 September 1990)
 Nellie Goes Swimming (19 September 1990)
 Nellie and the Flying Saucer (26 September 1990)
 Nellie and the Mystery Tour (3 October 1990)
 Nellie and the Brass Band (10 October 1990)
 Nellie at the Big Store (17 October 1990)
 Nellie Joins the Team (24 October 1990)
 Nellie Visits a Library (31 October 1990)
 Nellie on an Ocean Cruise (7 November 1990)
 Nellie Goes Time Travelling (14 November 1990)
 Nellie Goes Apple Picking (21 November 1990)
 Nellie at the Olympics (28 November 1990)
 Nellie Goes to Peanut Junction (5 December 1990)
 Nellie the Ski Champion (12 December 1990)
 Nellie Takes the Train (19 December 1990)

Broadcast
Nellie the Elephant first aired on ITV on 8 January 1990 starting off with the first 14 episodes of the first series and then with a second series on 5 September of the same year beginning with the next thirteen episodes and the last three from 8 January to 19 December 1990 both as part of Children's ITV.

UK VHS Releases
Though incredibly rare, the entire series, after airing on ITV, was released onto VHS in 1990, 1991, and 1992 by Tempo Video. Among these include:

Nellie the Elephant: 9 Fun Packed Adventures (93742) – Released: 1990

Nellie the Elephant 2: 9 Further Adventures (94182) – Released: 1990

NOTE: it got re-released in 1999 by Channel 5 video (distributed by Polygram Filmed Entertainment (UK) Ltd) as 9 Fantastic Adventures (0518363) and re-released again in 2002 by Universal Pictures (UK) Ltd as Nellie and the Whale and other stories (9068453)

Nellie the Elephant: Special Edition (95012) – Released: 1991

Nellie the Elephant: Nellie Goes to the Moon (95242) – Released: 1991

Nellie the Elephant: Nellie on an Ocean Cruise – Released: 1992

Australian VHS releases
 Roadshow Entertainment (1999–2001)

DVDs
In 2006 and 2007 two DVDs of Nellie the Elephant were released by Abbey Home Media (in its 'Tempo TV Classics' range) with ten episodes each on the DVDs.

Nellie the Elephant: Nellie and the Ghost (AHEDVD3161) – Released: 2006

Nellie the Elephant: Nellie and the Haunted House (AHEDVD3216) – Released: 2007

See also
 Junglies – another short-lived series by Ward also created for ITV.

External links
 
Toonhound
 

1990s British children's television series
1990 British television series debuts
1990 British television series endings
British children's animated adventure television series
Animated television series about elephants
ITV children's television shows
Nick Jr. original programming
Television series by FilmFair
English-language television shows
1990s British animated television series